Ramstein Air Base or Ramstein AB  is a United States Air Force base in Rhineland-Palatinate, a state in southwestern Germany. It serves as headquarters for the United States Air Forces in Europe – Air Forces Africa (USAFE-AFAFRICA) and also for NATO Allied Air Command (AIRCOM). Ramstein is located near the town of Ramstein-Miesenbach, which stands outside the base's west gate, in the rural district of Kaiserslautern.

Overview 

The host unit is the 86th Airlift Wing (86AW), commanded  by Brigadier General Otis C. Jones. The 86th Airlift Wing is composed of six groups, 30 squadrons and four bases in Germany, Spain, the Azores, and Belgium. Its mission is the operation and maintenance of airlift assets consisting of C-130Js, C-21s, and C-37A Gulfstream aircraft throughout Europe, Africa and the Middle East.

Also at Ramstein is the 435th Air Ground Operations Wing (formerly the 435th Air Base Wing) (435AGOW), which focuses on base-support responsibilities within the KMC. It is composed of five groups and 20 squadrons. The wing provides rapid mobility and agile combat support for military operations, and maintains expeditionary forces and infrastructure.

, the commander of the 435th AGOW is Colonel Bryan T. Callahan.

, the commander of the 521st AMOW is Colonel Adrienne Williams.

Ramstein's wings are assigned to the headquarters 3rd Air Force also based at RamsteinAB that controls most of the USAF Wings throughout Europe.

Ramstein AB is part of the Kaiserslautern Military Community (KMC), where more than 54,000 American service members and more than 5,400 US civilian employees live and work. U.S. organizations in the KMC also employ the services of more than 6,200 German workers. Air Force units in the KMC alone employ almost 9,800 military members, bringing with them nearly 11,100 family members. There are more than 16,200 military, U.S.civilian and U.S.contractors assigned to RamsteinAB alone.

In 1984, an enlisted airman (Sgt Darrel Dietlein), assigned to the 1964th Communications Group, solicited National Headquarters Civil Air Patrol to charter the first "Cadet Squadron" in Germany, naming the unit "Ramstein Cadet Squadron" and becoming the unit's first commander as a CAP First Lieutenant. The Ramstein Cadet Squadron was formed with Captain Mark Bailey serving as the unit's first liaison officer, as well as other like minded military volunteers and roughly six cadets. To this day, the squadron enjoys vibrant member participation, as well as base support, hosting drill competitions and encampments along with their traditional military studies and aerospace education efforts. The Ramstein Cadet Squadron commander  was Lt Col Chris Blank. The squadron is the parent unit for 2 flights located at Wiesbaden Army Airfield and Patch Barracks, Stuttgart. Membership  was 124 members.

In the subsequent years, a companion cadet squadron was formed at Spangdahlem Air Base. Distance learning cadets are located at SHAPE, Belgium and Hohenfels, Germany.

Current status 

While the KMC remains the largest U.S.community overseas at 53,000 people, the defense drawdown continues to shape its future. Due to the departure of other main operating installations, more than 100 geographically separated units receive support from Ramstein.

Ramstein Air Base also served as temporary housing for the United States men's national soccer team during the 2006World Cup.

There is often a Summer Camp to Ramstein from British CCF (RAF) and ATC cadets, as well as Civil Air Patrol encampments and tours like the ones held in July 2015 and June 2016.

Currently, Ramstein Air Base consists of two runways09/27 and 08/26two large aprons, one near a hangar north of Runways 27 and 26, and one to the north of 09 and 08. The north-western apron also has a small passenger terminal with two jetways. This means the air base is capable of joint-use operations, although currently there are no scheduled airlines running flights to and from Ramstein.

History 
The construction of the air base was a project designed and undertaken by the French Army and the U.S. Army Corps of Engineers from 1949 to 1952. It was an example of international collaboration: designed by French engineers, constructed by local businesses and large number of temporary and migrant workers of Italy, Portugal, Spain, Greece, and Turkey and operated by Americans.

The area was a swamp that had to be built up by two meters (six feet). Trainloads of earth were moved over the line and spread over the base's current area to raise it to its current level. Once the ground was level, building construction began. Two bases were laid out. Landstuhl Air Base on the south side and Ramstein Air Station (station, no airstrip) on the north. From 1948 to the opening of the bases in 1953, it was the largest one spot construction site in Europe employing over 270,000 Europeans at one time.

Previous names 
 Landstuhl Air Base, 
 Ramstein Air Base, 
 Landstuhl and Ramstein were separate bases until 
 Ramstein–Landstuhl Air Base, 
 Ramstein Air Base, present

Major USAF units assigned 
Source: Fletcher, Air Force Bases, Volume II

 86th Air Base Group, 5 April 195214 November 1968
 86th Wing (various designations), 21 August 195218 November 1960; 31 January 1973present
 (86th Air Base Group (later under various designations) assigned as subordinate unit, 21 August 1952)
 86th Air Division, 18 November 196014 November 1968
 7030th Combat Support Group, 6 April 19531 May 1960
 7030th Air Base Wing, 5 October 196614 June 1985
 Twelfth Air Force, 27 April 19531 January 1958
 7486th Air Defense Group, 1 May 195425 September 1957
 322d Air Division, 22 March 195412 August 1955
 322d Airlift Division, 23 June 19781 April 1992
 7455th Tactical Intelligence Wing, 1 September 19851 July 1992
 Seventeenth Air Force, 15 November 19597 October 1972; 1 October 200824 April 2012

 HQ, Atlantic Air Rescue Center (various designations), 8 October 196130 June 1973
 26th Tactical Reconnaissance Wing, 5 October 196631 January 1973
 HQ, USAFE, 10 March 1973present
 306th Strategic Wing, 15 August 197630 June 1978
 7th Air Division, 1 July 19781 February 1992
 316th Air Division, 14 June 19851 May 1991
 NHQ119 Civil Air PatrolRamstein Cadet SquadronUnit 3395, 1984present
 377th Combat Support Wing, 14 June 19851 May 1991
 435th Air Base Wing, 15 January 200416 July 2009
 435th Air Ground Operations Wing, 16 July 2009–present
 38th Combat Support Wing, 24 May 200530 June 2007
 521st Air Mobility Operations Wing, 4 September 2008present

Major U.S. Army units assigned 
Source: Fletcher, Air Force Bases, Volume II
 21st TSC / 39th Movement Control BN. (2008Present)
 USAREUR Movement Control Team / AMC Logistic Center
 USAREUR Overseas Replacement CenterContingency Operations / AMC Passenger Terminal

Origins 
In 1940, construction of today's  was stopped when a bridge that was being built across the Rhine River near Mannheim collapsed, leaving a section of autobahn that could not be used. A part of the unused autobahn to the west of Mannheim, near Kaiserslautern, was used as an airstrip by the Luftwaffe. The airstrip was also used by the advancing U.S. Army Air Forces during the final months of World WarII. The old autobahn section is still used as the access road to the east and west gates of the base and the A6 was rebuilt south of the air base after the war.

During the initial postwar era, the USAAF repaired several former Luftwaffe airfields in Bavaria, part of the American occupation zone of Germany. With the advent of the Berlin Blockade and the chilling of relations with the Soviet Union, by 1948, it became obvious to United States Air Force planners that these bases were tactically untenable because of their proximity to the East German and Czechoslovakian borders.

With the creation of NATO in response to Cold War tensions in Europe in 1949, USAFE wanted its vulnerable fighter units in what was then West Germany moved west of the Rhine River to provide greater air defense warning time. France agreed to provide air base sites within their zone of occupation in the Rhineland-Palatinate as part of the NATO expansion program.

Construction of the modern USAF base near Kaiserslautern began in April 1948 under the provisions of a Franco-American reciprocal agreement. Two separate, but adjoining bases were designed. A headquarters base for Twelfth Air Force, along with several NATO organizations, designated as Ramstein Air Station; and an operational fighter base, designated as Landstuhl Air Base.  What is today known as Kisling Memorial Drive would separate the two facilities.

Enough construction was completed in mid-1952 that LandstuhlAB was opened on 5 August. Its facilities included a runway, dispersal hardstands, a control tower, ramps, and other flight-related facilities and the associated flying and support units. On , Det1, 86th Fighter-Bomber Wing arrived at LandstuhlAB from Neubiberg Air Base near Munich.

On , Ramstein Air Station was opened. Ramstein was the location of headquarters, Twelfth Air Force, and supported family housing, base exchange, commissary, dependents' schools and other administrative offices for the WAFs (Women's Air Force). The barracks that were built at Ramstein AS were used to house WAFs and single women that worked as U.S. Government employees at both RamsteinAS and LandstuhlAB. On , Headquarters, Twelfth Air Force was activated on Ramstein Air Base, having moved from its joint facilities with HQ USAFE at Wiesbaden AB. What was not generally known at the time and not made public until after the end of the Cold War in 1993, was the desire to have HQTwelfth Air Force in close proximity to the Air Defense Operations Center (ADOC)Kindsbach,  'Kindsbach Cave'the site of NATO's underground combat operations center.

The 86th Air Base Group was activated as the main base support unit for Landstuhl while the 7030th HQ Support Group was the main base support unit for Ramstein. On , the two bases were consolidated into the largest NATO-controlled air base in service on the continent. It was called "Ramstein–Landstuhl Air Base", but later, after the German government continued construction of the A6 autobahn from Kaiserslautern to Saarbrücken, the autobahn cut off access at the south of the base which is where the main gate was in the city limit of Landstuhl. The main gate was moved to the west side of the base which was in the town of Ramstein. The two bases were joined and the current Kisling Memorial Drive cut off to the public which made one base. In 1961, the base was officially named "Ramstein Air Base".

One legacy of the two separate air bases is that the north side of Ramstein retained a separate APO from the south side. The north side (Ramstein AB) is APOAE09012, while the south side (LandstuhlAB) is APOAE09009. Also separate Combat Support Groups, the 7030th for the north side, and the 86th for the south side existed. These were consolidated in the 1980s, and the two Combat Support units were merged into the 377th Combat Support Wing. There is still a north and south side Fitness Centers. The current northside Community Center before housed the WAF NCO Club. As well, there were two Movie Theaters on the North side and two on the South side. Currently, only two still stand on the north side: a remodeled Nightingale Theater (known before as the Four Corners Theater) on the corner across from the Base gas Station, and the north side AAFES dry cleaners that was known as the Ramstein Rocket Theater. On the South side, there are the current Hercules Theater (Falcon Theater) next to HQ 86th Air Wing and a non-existent theater for which new barracks are currently under construction at the corner across the street from Moms/Gear-up shops called the Landstuhler Knights Theater.

Near the Ramstein Air Base is the Landstuhl Regional Medical Center (LRMC), operated by the United States Army. Although part of the Kaiserslautern Military Community, LRMC has a separate history and was never a part of Ramstein or Landstuhl Air Bases, although both facilities have utilized the medical facilities at LRMC since they were established in 1953. Currently there are plans on the drawing board from the U.S. Department of Defense to build a new Medical Center on the current U.S. Army Weilerbach Storage Installation just to the east of RamsteinAB. Construction is to be completed in and around 2024.. It will be a twelve-story facility to house all departments of LRMC and the current Ramstein AB Clinic along with Dental Clinic facilities for the whole KMC. In turn, the East Gate to RamsteinAB will be extended from its current location to just off the Autobahn 6 Einsiedlerhof exit to the base at what is known as the Elvis Gate.

Operational history

86th Wing 

Reassigned from Neubiberg Air Base, West Germany in 1952 and except for a period between 1968 and 1973, the 86th Wing, under various designations, has been the main operational and host unit at Ramstein Air Base.

Throughout the 1950s, the 86th was primarily a Fighter-Bomber Wing. In 1960, it was realigned to an air defense mission and became the 86th Air Division (Defense). The 86th AD was inactivated in 1968. Returning as an F-4 Phantom II Tactical Fighter Wing in 1973, the 86th TFW performed that mission until 1994, deploying components to the Middle East during the 1990 Gulf War.

On , the Strategic Air Command 306th Strategic Wing was activated at Ramstein with a KC-135 air refueling and an RC-135 reconnaissance mission. The 306th also functioned as the focal point for all SAC operations in Europe and as liaison between SAC and USAFE.

In June 1985, the 316th Air Division was activated, centralizing command authority at Ramstein. The 86 TFW became the division's flight operations arm, while the newly formed 377th Combat Support Wing, also activated in 1985, became responsible for the logistical and administrative support on base, replacing the 86th and 7030 Combat Support Wings. On , Ramstein Air Base was the site of the tragic Ramstein airshow disaster, which killed 72 spectators and three pilots, and injured hundreds.

After the Cold War, the 86th was realigned to become the 86th Airlift Wing. On , the 55th Aeromedical Airlift Squadron moved from the 435thAW at Rhein-Main Air Base Germany to Ramstein. On 1 October, the 75th and 76th Airlift Squadron arrived at Ramstein from the 60th AW at Travis Air Force Base California, and 437thAW at Charleston AFB South Carolina, respectively.

In 1999, the activation of the 86th Contingency Response Group brought the airfield and aerial port operations and provision of force protection at contingency airfields mission to the wing.

On , the 38th Combat Support Wing was activated to enhance support to USAFE geographically separated units. This wing was inactivated in 2007. The wing is the headquarters for the existing 721st Air Mobility Operations Group at Ramstein and the 521st AMOG at Naval Station Rota, Spain. The 521st AMOW provides an enhanced level of control for the AMC route structure in Europe, which includes critical locations for getting people, cargo and patients to and from current war zones.

26th Tactical Reconnaissance Wing 

On , French President Charles de Gaulle announced that France would withdraw from NATO's integrated military structure.

Assigned squadrons of the 26th TRW at Ramstein were:
 38th Tactical Reconnaissance (RF-4C, Tail Code: RR)
 526th Fighter Interceptor/Tactical Fighter (F-102/F-4E (1970) Tail Code: RS)
 7th Special Operation (C-130, C-47, UH-1)

While at Ramstein, the 26th TRW acquired a number of other units with different flying missions. One function gained by the 26 TRW, almost immediately after arriving at Ramstein, was the maintenance and flying of the HQ USAFE liaison aircraft. In addition, the Wing was responsible for flying members of the HQ USAFE staff to Air Force and NATO bases throughout Europe. In addition, the 26th TRW was only designated as a flight, because of its small size. It consisted of a mixture of aircraft, including: T-29s, T-33s, T-39s, C-54s, O-2s, H-19s, and UH-1s.

In 1971 a detachment of the 630th Military Airlift Support Squadron from Rhein-Main Air Base was assigned to Ramstein and a large cargo aerial port constructed. This allowed Military Airlift Command C-141 and C-5 Galaxy aircraft to use Ramstein as a transshipment point for material, which was then moved within USAFE by C-130 tactical transports.

In the spring of 1972, the 7th Special Operations Squadron (SOS) was assigned flying C-130Es, C-47As, and UH-1Ns. Because of the special operations mission of the 7 SOS, it reported directly to HQ USAFE for operational control.

NATO command center 
From its inception, Ramstein was designed as a NATO command base. In 1957, Ramstein provided support for NATO's HQ Fourth Allied Tactical Air Force, which moved to Ramstein from Trier Air Base on  upon the closure of that facility. Also on that date, HQ Twelfth Air Force was transferred to Bergstrom Air Force Base, Texas, and was assigned to Tactical Air Command. It was replaced by HQ Seventeenth Air Force (USAFE) which was moved from North Africa. In turn, the 17th AF was replaced by its mother unit HQ USAFE from Lindsey Air Station, Wiesbaden, Germany in 1973. The HQ 17th AF was moved to Sembach AB at that time and controlled all USAF Air Divisions and Wings north of the Alps, with the exception of the British Isles and Scandinavia, which were controlled by HQ 3rd AF at Mildenhall.

On , several headquarters were relocated into and out of Ramstein, when SeventeenthAF moved to Sembach Air Base to make room for the expected move of HQUSAFE to Ramstein. This entire operation, code-named "Creek Action", was carried out as part of the USAF's new worldwide policy of locating the most vital headquarters in thinly populated rural areas rather than near cities. Later, HQ USAFE was moved due to the fact that US Intelligence found that the Soviets had plans to invade Western Europe through the Fulda Gap in Germany. The military thought to move vital HQs on the other side of the Rhein River for protection.

As a result of this policy change, Ramstein air base became a large multi-national NATO center: in addition to the USAFE's headquarters, it also housed the new NATO headquarters of the Allied Air Forces Central Europe (AAFCE).

The AAFCE also commanded the 2nd Allied Tactical Air Force (2ATAF) and the 4th ATAF. The 4th ATAF, which had been headquartered at Ramstein for many years, included the 1st Canadian Air Group, 1st and 2nd Divisions of the West German Air Force, and units of the USAFE's 3rd and 17th Air Force.

HQ USAFE fully completed its move from Wiesbaden to Ramstein in early 1991.

With USAFE's arrival in 1973, Ramstein entered a period of expansion. The duel commander of the 316th AD / 86 TFW became host commander of Americans living in the Kaiserslautern Military Community instead of the US Army 21st Commanding General. The Wiesbaden USAF Community was then traded to the US Army Control as for an even Kaiserlautern switch. The KMC from the 1950s to the early 1990s had an average population of Americans of 110,000, outnumbering those Germans in the City of Kaiserslautern for that period.

In December 1980, HQ Fourth Allied Tactical Air Force was moved from Ramstein to Heidelberg and co-located with HQ Central Army Group.

Today, the base is home to the Allied Air Command, which is responsible to Joint Force Command Brunssum, the only and main NATO command unit on Ramstein AB.

ADOC Kindsbach 

Close to Ramstein was the site of Air Defense Operations Center (ADOC)Kindsbach, AKA 'Kindsbach Cave' – the site of Europe's underground combat operations center.

The facility was located in a former German western front command headquarters. The French took control of the underground bunker after World War II, and USAFE assumed control in 1953.

The center was a state-of-the-art, 67-room,  facility where USAFE could have led an air war against the Soviet Union. The center had a digital computer to work out bombing problems, cryptographic equipment for coded message traffic and its own photo lab to develop reconnaissance photos. Responsible for an air space extending deep behind the Iron Curtain, the center interacted directly with The Pentagon, NATO, Supreme Headquarters Allied Powers Europe and all USAFE bases. With its massive telephone switchboard and 80 teletype machines, the cave was plugged into everything in the outside world. The center was receiving more than 1,000 calls a day.

As a further measure of protection, the cave was fully self-contained with its own water supply, electric backup-generators, climate controls, dining facilities and sleeping accommodations for its 125-man crew. Visitor passes were rarely issued to this secret facility.

Throughout the years, leadership changed but USAFE led the operations through numbered Air Forces. The center's commander was the USAFE Advanced Echelon. The glassed-in office was on the top floor of the three-story underground command center. Directly under the office was the management for offensive air operations. And the bottom floor office was the management for defensive air operations – to include support for U.S. Army forces and German Civil Defense. All three offices had a full view of the massive Air Operations Center map on the opposing wall.

The AOC was the largest room in the complex. Its three-story map was used to plot minute-by-minute movements of friendly and unidentified aircraft. But the center was much more than just a tracking station, because it could also react to threats. They always knew the current operational status of air weapons in theater including missiles, and could dispatch armed response "at a moment's notice".

By the early 1960s, the manual plotting system used to track aircraft at the cave and elsewhere throughout Germany was too slow and inaccurate for the quick responses necessary. Beginning in 1962, airmen trained in the new 412L air weapons control system began to arrive in Germany and at the cave. Over the next year, the new GE semi-automatic system was installed. When complete at the cave, the current air picture over East and West Germany, as well as parts of the eastern soviet bloc countries, was displayed on a  screen with radar information provided by various 412L sites located throughout Germany. Senior U.S. staff monitored the dynamic display 24/7. Over the next several years, additional 412L sites throughout Germany joined the network until the manual system had been totally replaced.

By 1984, the Kindsbach Cave had become too small and its cost for renovation too high. Today the Kindsbach Cave is private property, through tours of the cave can be arranged. The cave is overgrown by vegetation, trees, and new housing.

Drone war control center 
In April 2015, Ramstein Air Base was reported by German and international media as an important control center in the drone war staged under the Obama administration against targets in areas like Pakistan, Yemen, Afghanistan and Somalia. The German government claimed not to have been informed about this function of the U.S. base.

In a TV and online documentary, the German Das Erste channel cited 2014 reports from Norddeutscher Rundfunk, WDR, and the  that revealed Ramstein to be an important hub in the drone war against terror suspects. New data, provided by Edward Snowden affiliate Glenn Greenwald, supported these reports with classified documents from inside the U.S. administration and were also presented in the Citizenfour video documentary. The revelation of US drone activities from Ramstein lead to nationwide anti-drone protests under the banner of "Stop Ramstein Air Base".

In 2019, three Yemenis who lost relatives in a 2012 US drone strike took legal action against the German government for aiding the breaking of international law by the United States, by tolerating these operations from Ramstein. The German Higher Administrative Court in Münster ruled that the German government must take appropriate measures to control whether the US army follows international law at Ramstein Air Base. However, the possibilities of Germany to control US activities on their territory are very limited as the United States have jurisdiction over Ramstein Air Base.

Illegal arms and munition transports 
In 2015, the Serbian newspaper  reported about Ramstein Air Base being used by the United States Armed Forces to transport arms and munitions to Syria. At the end of 2017, an anonymous U.S. official stated that the U.S. does, indeed, use Ramstein Air Base to supplement Syrian rebels with arms and munition. The German Federal Government stated that it did not grant the necessary permits for these transports, nor that it had been informed about them. The kaiserslautern public prosecutor's office did not initiate any official investigations. She checked generally accessible sources, on which some of the press articles mentioned were based, and obtained information from the authorities involved in monitoring foreign trade. According to the review, there was "no evidence of concrete arms transports to Syria via Ramstein". However, the journalistic conclusion cannot be ruled out, according to the prosecution authority. Previous investigations of the Ramstein Air Base, such as the Abu Omar case, have proven to be unsuccessful. If the investigations into the arms and ammunition transports had been successful, this would have constituted a violation of the German Kriegswaffenkontrollgesetz (War Weapons Control Act) and the Foreign Trade and Payments Act.

Afghanistan Evacuation 

In late Summer 2021, Ramstein Air Base became the transfer point for thousands of Afghan civilians fleeing Afghanistan following the fall of Kabul back into Taliban hands as U.S. and NATO forces withdrew from the country. Civilian airlines under the Civil Reserve Air Fleet, such as Delta, American, Eastern, and United were allowed to land at Ramstein and serve as flights to take Afghan families and other supporters to the U.S. and NATO forces to new lives in the United States. Those who had to stay on the base were cared for in makeshift living centers which were set up to tend to their needs until they could be processed and flown to the United States.

Russo-Ukrainian War 

On , Ramstein Air Base hosted a meeting of the International Advisory Group on Ukraine's Defense and Counteraction to Russia, convened by US Secretary of Defense Lloyd Austin to synchronize and coordinate Ukraine's military assistance in the war with Russia. The event was attended by heads of defense agencies of 42 countries. The meeting was attended by Minister of Defense of Ukraine Oleksii Reznikov.

The participating countries agreed on financial assistance to Ukraine and the supply of "heavy" weapons. They also allowed Ukraine to strike at Russian strategic sites with Western weapons. The next meetings are planned to be held monthly.

Based units 
Flying and notable non-flying units based at Ramstein Air Base.

Units marked GSU are Geographically Separate Units, which although based at Ramstein, are subordinate to a parent unit based at another location.

United States Air Force 

United States Air Forces in Europe – Air Forces Africa (USAFE-AFAFRICA)
 Headquarters United States Air Forces in EuropeAir Forces Africa
 Third Air Force
Headquarters Third Air Force
86th Airlift Wing
86th Operations Group
37th Airlift SquadronC-130J Hercules
76th Airlift SquadronC-21A, C-37A
86th Aeromedical Evacuation Squadron
86th Operational Support Squadron
86th Civil Engineer Group
786th Civil Engineer Squadron
86th Logistics Readiness Group
86th Maintenance Group
86th Medical Group
86th Mission Support Group
786th Force Support Squadron
435th Air Expeditionary Wing
435th Air Ground Operations Wing
4th Air Support Operations Group
2nd Air Support Operations Squadron
7th Combat Weather Squadron
435th Air and Space Communications Group
1st Air & Space Communications Operations Squadron
1st Combat Communications Squadron
1st Communications Maintenance Squadron
435th Contingency Response Group
435th Construction and Training Squadron
435th Contingency Response Squadron
435th Contingency Response Support Squadron
435th Security Forces Squadron

Air Combat Command (ACC)
 Sixteenth Air Force
 480th Intelligence, Surveillance and Reconnaissance Wing
 693rd Intelligence, Surveillance and Reconnaissance Group (GSU)
 24th Intelligence Squadron
 402nd Intelligence Squadron
 450th Intelligence Squadron
 693rd Intelligence Support Squadron

Air Mobility Command (AMC)
 United States Air Force Expeditionary Center
 521st Air Mobility Operations Wing
 721st Air Mobility Operations Group
 10th Expeditionary Aeromedical Evacuation Flight
 313th Expeditionary Operations Support Squadron
 721st Aerial Port Squadron
 721st Aircraft Maintenance Squadron

United States Army 
United States Army Europe and Africa (USAREUR-AF)
 21st Theater Sustainment Command
 Ramstein Gateway Reception Center

NATO 
Supreme Headquarters Allied Powers Europe (SHAPE)
 Allied Air Command (AIRCOM)
 thumb | right | 786th CES Pest Management specialist exterminating wasps in a roof

Schools 
There are four schools at Ramstein Air Base: Ramstein Elementary School (grades PreK–2), Ramstein Intermediate School (grades 3–5), Ramstein American Middle School (grades 6–8), and Ramstein High School (grades 9–12). All of these schools are run by DoDDS, a component of DoDEA.

In popular culture

Fictional entities 
 Lois Lane was born at Ramstein Air Base despite the base opening in 1948 and Lane debuting in 1938.

In films 
 Ramstein was the location where Colonel Masters is taken after being rescued by his son in Iron Eagle (1986).
 Ramstein was the location of the aborted landing of Air Force One when it is hijacked by a group of terrorists in Air Force One (1997). Rickenbacker Air National Guard Base stood in for Ramstein as the film was shot mostly in the state of Ohio.
Ramstein was the location where Ethan Hunt and his team are given a second chance to retrieve stolen plutonium in Mission: Impossible – Fallout (2018)

In games 
Ramstein Air Base appears in the video game Tom Clancy's EndWar as a possible battlefield. In the game, NATO has since collapsed, and the base is controlled by the European Federation.
In Call of Duty: Modern Warfare 3, Ramstein Air Base suffers a surprise invasion by Russian Ground Forces after a gas attack.
In Wargame: European Escalation, one mission of the NATO campaign takes place in the base.

In literature 
Both Ramstein Air Force Base and the Ramstein air disaster figure as plot points in Donna Leon's second Guido Brunetti novel, Death in a Strange Country (1993)
 The base was mentioned in Walter Dean Myers' book Sunrise over Fallujah.

In music 
Rammstein, a German metal band, formed in 1994. They have stated that they take their name from the Ramstein air show disaster; in turn, the asteroid 110393 Rammstein is named after the band. The band's self-titled song (on the album Herzeleid (1995)) refers to the event.

In television 
 In The West Wing episode "Memorial Day", Donna Moss is flown to Ramstein to be treated at Landstuhl Regional Medical Center nearby.
 In The West Wing episode "Red Haven's on Fire", Air Force Veteran Leo McGarry refers to "Ramstein Air Force Base".
 In the pilot of Homeland, Marine Sergeant Nicholas Brody is debriefed in Ramstein after being rescued from an al-Qaeda base in Iraq.
 In the Madam Secretary episode "The Seventh Floor", journalist Colin Mitchell is flown to Ramstein after being released by the Sudanese government.
 In Law & Order: Special Victims Unit, chief medical examiner Melinda Warner reveals in season 7's "Blast" that she served on the base in the U.S. Air Force during the Gulf War.

Accidents and incidents

Red Army Faction car bombing,  
A total of 20 victims were injured, some seriously.

Ramstein air show disaster,  
The Ramstein air show disaster was a mid-air collision that occurred at the Ramstein Air Force Base during the Flugtag '88 air show on Sunday, killing 70 people.

C-5 crash,  
On , a C-5 Galaxy Transport plane carrying U.S. servicemen to the Persian Gulf crashed shortly after takeoff, killing 13 people and injuring 4 others.

Environmental scandal 
In 2014, it was revealed that poisonous extinguishing foams (PFCs) were used on Ramstein Air Base and other U.S. air bases in the region. These are now contaminating lakes, rivers and the ground water in the region. In one river, the contamination was 7700 times higher than the safety limit set by the European Union. These contaminations are linked to cancer and birth defects.

 frameless | right

Environment
Among other duties, the  performs pest management for the base.

References

Further reading

External links 

 

Airports in Rhineland-Palatinate
Buildings and structures in Rhineland-Palatinate
Installations of the United States Air Force in Germany
Kaiserslautern (district)
Military airbases established in 1953
NATO installations in Germany